Pehuenche Hydroelectric Plant  is a hydroelectric power station in Maule Region, Chile. The plant uses water from Melado River and produces  of electricity.

References

Energy infrastructure completed in 1991
Buildings and structures in Maule Region
Hydroelectric power stations in Chile
1991 establishments in Chile